The Indian locomotive class WAG-2 is a class of 25 kV AC electric locomotives that was imported from japan in the 1960s for Indian Railways. The model name stands for broad gauge (W), AC Current (A), Goods traffic (G) engine, 2nd (2). A total of 45 WAG-2 locomotives were built by The Japanese Group (a consortium of Mitsubishi, Hitachi and Toshiba) between 1964 and 1965. They entered service in 1964.

The WAG-2 served both passenger and freight trains for over 40 years. As of January 2020, All locomotives have been removed from service all were scrapped.

History
These locomotives were built by a consortium of Mitsubishi, Hitachi and Toshiba (The Japanese Group, as attested by a plaque fixed on their sides) as a second option to the Europeans WAG-1. They were delivered in 1960 and were a bit lower powered than the WAM1 but had similar Bo-Bo wheel arrangement (4 wheels per bogie) with four Hitachi DC traction motors connected to the wheels permanently in parallel through a WN geared drive. The WAG-2 had Ignitron rectifiers just like the WAG-1 but some were later were refitted with Excitron rectifiers. Some even had the Mitsubishi logo painted on their sides.

These have not been retrofitted with air train brakes. Like the WAG-1 they were also used around the ER-SER-NER-NR circuit as it was the first AC electrified area and hauled ordinary passenger trains and freights only. They were also used double-headed for freight trains. They had Four traction motors permanently coupled in parallel are fed by ignitron rectifiers. Speed control is by a tap changer on the input transformer. Mitsubishi transformer, 20 taps. Oerlikon exhauster and compressor, Arno rotary converter. They were homed at Asansol Loco Shed of Eastern Railways and then transferred to Bhusawal and Itarsi sheds of CR in 1985.Due to aging these locomotives were withdrawn in 2001.None have been preserved

Specifications 

Manufacturer:The Japanese Group (consortium of Hitachi, Mitsubishi and Toshiba)
Build dates: 1964-65
Wheel arrangement: B-B (monomotor bogies like WAG 1)
Traction Motors: Hitachi EFCO HKK (1270 kW, 1250 V, 1080 A, 695 rpm, weight 5300 kg).
Transformer: Hitachi AFI AMOC. 32 taps.
Rectifiers: AEV-48 silicon rectifiers, 2040 A / 2550 kW.
Pantographs: Two Faiveley AM-12

Locomotive shed 
  All the locomotives of this class has been withdrawn from service.

See also

Rail transport in India#History
Indian Railways
Locomotives of India
Rail transport in India

References

External links 
[IRFCA] Indian Railways FAQ: Locomotives—Specific classes : AC Electric
[IRFCA] Indian Railways FAQ: Diesel and Electric Locomotive Specifications
11081 Colour Photographs, Indian Railways

25 kV AC locomotives
Bo-Bo locomotives
Electric locomotives of India
Railway locomotives introduced in 1964
5 ft 6 in gauge locomotives
Mitsubishi locomotives
Toshiba locomotives
Hitachi locomotives